Prisco is a given name and surname.

Prisco or Priscos may also refer to:
Di Prisco, a surname
Los Priscos, a criminal group affiliated with the Medellin cartel in Colombia
San Prisco, commune in the Province of Caserta, Italy
Priscos, parish in Braga, Portugal
Teodoro "Prisco" Alcalde Millos (1913–1995), Peruvian international football player